Mother! The Mosquitoes is a 2000 Hungarian comedy film directed by Miklós Jancsó.

Cast 
 Zoltán Mucsi - Kapa
 Péter Scherer - Pepe
 Emese Vasvári - Emese

References

External links 

2000 comedy films
2000 films
Hungarian comedy films